Epigridae is a family of very small sea snails, marine gastropod molluscs in the superfamily Truncatelloidea, and clade Littorinimorpha.

Taxonomy 
Genera within the family Epigridae include:
 Genus Epigrus C. Hedley, 1903 - the type genus

References 

 The Taxonomicon

 
Taxa named by Winston Ponder